Cynthia Hargrave (June 12, 1957 – June 9, 2021) was an American film producer and screenwriter. She is best known for her work on Bottle Rocket (1993) and Perfume (2001).

References

External links 
 

1957 births
2021 deaths
American film producers
American women screenwriters
American women film producers
20th-century American screenwriters
20th-century American women
21st-century American women